The Rosario–Córdoba Highway is a highway in the central region of Argentina, which links the third- and second-largest cities in the country. The route was inaugurated on December 22, 2010. It has total length of 410 km (255 mi) and an estimated cost of 1.6 billion USD.

National roads in Santa Fe Province
Transport in Rosario, Santa Fe
Cordoba Province
Proposed roads
Proposed transport infrastructure in Argentina